Pink Hearts Yellow Moons is the debut album from Denver quartet Dressy Bessy.  The album was released on Kindercore Records in 1999.

The songs "Just Like Henry" and "If You Should Try to Kiss Her" were included on the soundtrack to the 1999 movie But I'm a Cheerleader.

Critical reception
The Stranger called the album "by far, the catchiest indie-pop record of 1999 ... With Pink Hearts, Yellow Moons, every day was summer." CMJ New Music Report wrote that it "is a candy dish full of light, sugary pop songs that beg you to add your own la-la background vocals."

Track listing
"I Found Out"
"Just Like Henry"
"Look Around"
"Little TV"
"Jenny Come On"
"If You Should Try to Kiss Her"
"Extra-Ordinary"
"Makeup"
"Big Vacation"
"You Stand Here"
"My Maryanne"

References

1999 debut albums
Dressy Bessy albums
Kindercore Records albums